Iván Dubois (born 24 April 1995) is an Argentine professional footballer who plays as a centre-back.

Career
Dubois started his career with Atlanta, he was promoted into their senior squad during the 2014 Primera B Metropolitana campaign and subsequently made two appearances; notably his professional debut versus Deportivo Español on 6 September. Months after the 2014 season concluded, Dubois was signed by Argentine Primera División side Tigre. He remained for 2015, 2016 and 2016–17 but failed to make a first-team appearance. On 30 June 2017, Dubois completed a move to Deportivo Español in Primera B Metropolitana. He subsequently made thirteen appearances in his debut campaign.

Dubois joined Primera B Metropolitana's Justo José de Urquiza in July 2018. Seven appearances followed.

Career statistics
.

References

External links

1995 births
Living people
Footballers from Buenos Aires
Argentine footballers
Association football defenders
Primera B Metropolitana players
Argentine Primera División players
Club Atlético Atlanta footballers
Club Atlético Tigre footballers
Deportivo Español footballers
Asociación Social y Deportiva Justo José de Urquiza players